Ballin or Ballin may refer to:

Surname
Ada Ballin (1863–1906), English author
Albert Ballin (1857–1918), German inventor of cruise ships
Ernst Hirsch Ballin (born 1950), Dutch politician
Hugo Ballin (1879–1956), American film director and production designer
Mabel Ballin (1887–1958), American film actress
Matt Ballin (born 1984), Australian rugby player
Mogens Ballin (1871–1914), Danish artist

Songs
"Ballin, a song by Bizzy Bone from the album A Song for You
"Ballin, a song by Chief Keef from the album Finally Rich
"Ballin", a 2013 song by Logic featuring C Dot Castro from the album Young Sinatra: Welcome to Forever
"Ballin" (Juicy J song), a 2016 song by Juicy J featuring Kanye West
"Ballin (Young Jeezy song), a 2011 song by American rapper Young Jeezy
"Ballin (Mustard song), a 2019 song by American producer Mustard featuring rapper Roddy Ricch from the album Perfect Ten
"Ballin", a 2022 song by American rapper A Boogie wit da Hoodie

Other uses
"Ballin (The Boondocks), a 2007 episode of the television series The Boondocks
, an ocean liner

See also

United States v. Ballin, U.S. Supreme Court case that established the constitutional definition of "quorum to do business"

Balling (disambiguation)